Mix & Match may refer to:

 Mix & Match, Hoosier Lottery
 Mix & Match, Pennsylvania Lottery
 Mix & Match, a South Korean television series
 Mix & Match (EP), EP by Loona Odd Eye Circle
 Mix & match COVID-19 vaccination, a cross-vaccination of multiple COVID-19 vaccinces